Abisara gerontes, the dark banded Judy, is a butterfly in the family Riodinidae. It is found in Sierra Leone, Liberia, Ivory Coast, Ghana, Nigeria, Cameroon, Gabon, the Republic of the Congo and the Democratic Republic of the Congo. The habitat consists of tropical humid forests and lowland forests in hilly terrain.

Description
Upperside. Antennae, thorax, and abdomen black. Anterior wings next the body nearly black, a third next the tips greyish brown, with a circular eyespot thereon; the iris being black and yellow, the pupil blue. A white streak rises on these wings, which crossing the posterior edges, ends at the middle of the posterior ones in a sharp point. Posterior wings blackish brown, the upper corners being greyish brown, where is a yellow mark, not unlike a human ear, the inner part being tinged with a shining blue colour. These wings are furnished with two broad tails, which suddenly become narrow and short, the tips white, and along the edges streaked with blue.

Underside. Palpi wanting. Feet yellow. Breast white. Anterior wings lighter coloured than on the upperside. The white streaks are very conspicuous, and near the tips is another streak of ash colour. The eye at the tips is very discernible. Posterior wings lighter coloured on this side, being chiefly ash colour, with a brown streak longitudinally placed, verged at the bottom with yellow and blue streaks. The ear-like mark is also very plain on this side. Wingspan  inches (44 mm).

Subspecies
Abisara gerontes gerontes (Sierra Leone, Liberia, Ivory Coast, Ghana, Nigeria: south and the Cross River loop, western Cameroon)
Abisara gerontes gabunica Riley, 1932 (southern Cameroon, Gabon, Congo, Democratic Republic of the Congo)

References

Butterflies described in 1781
Abisara
Descriptions from Illustrations of Exotic Entomology